Randall Zindler is the CEO of disaster relief agency Medair and helped to coordinate the humanitarian effort following the Asian tsunami in December 2004.

Personal history
Upon graduating from Minnesota State University after doing a bachelor's degree in geography, Zindler has held positions in Food for the Hungry International and Gate Gourmet. He completed his MBA from Lancaster University Management School in 1999.

References

External links
 Medair Presentation Brochure

Year of birth missing (living people)
Living people
Minnesota State University Moorhead alumni